Johri is a village in Bagpat district in Uttar Pradesh, India. It lies approximately 9 km from Baraut and 4 km from Binauli. Two more villages, namely Angadpur and Kheri, are close by. It is difficult to distinguish between three villages are no physical boundary is there as such.

History 
Johri is a birthplace of freedom fighter Jay Ram Singh Tomar. Jay Ram Singh Tomar is a farmer who fought against the English. Once he caught by the English soldiers and they hanged him till death. Now his memorable statue is being created by the people of Johri with the help of Indian government.

Climate 
The climate of Johri is warm and cool, here temperature from April to September is about 22 to 42 degree Celsius and 9 to 18 degree Celsius in October to March.

Education 
There are two government primary school for boys and two for girls. Several private English Medium Schools are also functioning well.

Sports
Johri hosts a number of sporting events, Bridge and shooting are the main sports over here. Dheeraj Tomar who started his career as a Police Officer but also has interest in cards also, because of this he started playing bridge and build the bridge team in his own village. His team played a lot of national and international tournaments. Prakashi Tomar and Chandro Tomar are shooters of this village. Recently Govt has provided a  sports field with a Guest House. Premier Shooting Range is a Center of Sports Authority of India. A new indoor range has been constructed at a plot, provided by the farmers of johri. Youngsters also get training in Archery and Kabaddi. More than 200 villagers, after getting training in Shooting, have got employment in Railway, Airlines, Army and Police.

Notable people
 Chandro Tomar, octogenarian sharp shooter
 Prakashi Tomar, sharpshooter
 Seema Tomar,  Silver Medal winner at the International Shooting Sport Federation

References 

Villages in Bagpat district